David Wylie may refer to:

 David Wylie (footballer) (born 1966), former Scottish football goalkeeper
 David Wylie (author) (born 1929), author of the book City, Save Thyself! - Nuclear Terror and the Urban Ballot
 David James Wylie (1859–1932), English-born civil engineer, farmer, rancher and political figure in Saskatchewan